Alf Erik Gillis Svensén (28 July 1893 – 17 December 1935) was a Swedish gymnast who competed at the 1920 Summer Olympics. He was part of the Swedish team that won the gold medal in the Swedish system event.

Svensén was a bomb expert at the Swedish Air Force and held the rank of captain.

References

1893 births
1935 deaths
Swedish male artistic gymnasts
Gymnasts at the 1920 Summer Olympics
Olympic gymnasts of Sweden
Olympic gold medalists for Sweden
Olympic medalists in gymnastics
Swedish Air Force officers
Medalists at the 1920 Summer Olympics